Petrosia ficiformis, commonly known as the stony sponge, is a species of petrosiid sea sponge in the order Haplosclerida.

Taxonomy
Petrosia ficiformis was first described by J.L.M. Poiret as Spongia ficiformers. Its name comes from the Greek: "pétra" - πέτρα - rock, "physis" - φύση - nature, "fórma" - φόρμα - shape, meaning "naturally-shaped rock". It is classified under the subgenus Petrosia of the genus Petrosia. It belongs to the family Petrosiidae or the suborder Petrosina.

Distribution

The species has been described at the following locations: Adriatic Sea, Aegean Sea, Azores, Canaries, Madeira, Cape Verde, Ionian Sea, Levantine Sea, Mediterranean Sea, North Atlantic, Tunisian Plateau/Gulf of Sidra, West Africa, and Western Mediterranean.

Characteristics
Petrosia ficiformis is usually purple brown in colour due to symbiosis with photosynthetic cyanobacteria, but can be white in the absence of light. It has a compact, hard texture, with spherical oscula irregularly spread over the surface.

Chemical compounds
Petrosia ficiformis is one of the sponges which produces more acetylenes, which are isolated for different purposes in  industry. A characteristic example of this is Petrosynol, a polyacetylene of 30 atoms, which was isolated in 1987 from the genus Petrosia. It provides this sponge's protection through its antimicrobial and antifungical activity.

Petrosia ficiformis is specifically known to synthesize Petroformynes, a type of hydroxylated polyacetylene with cytotoxic and antitumoral activities. The skeleton of this species is formed by a carbonated chain of 46 to 47 Carbon atoms.

Predators
Petrosia ficiformis is the main and preferred food of the nudibranch Peltodoris atromaculata, which is generally found over the sponge. They accumulate the chemical compounds of the sponge on their digestive tract and use them as one of their defensive strategies.

References

Petrosina